L'emigrante, internationally released as Little Funny Guy, is a 1973 Italian comedy film directed by Pasquale Festa Campanile.

Plot 
At the end of 1900s Saturnino Cavallo leaves his family to emigrate to America, in search of fortune, but his traces were lost. In Naples during the 1920s, his son Peppino Cavallo (Adriano Celentano), grown up, wakes up every night thinking of his father, with such insistence that he eventually decides to go look for him in America.

Cast 

Adriano Celentano: Peppino Cavallo
Claudia Mori: Rosita Flores
Sybil Danning: Pamela 
Lino Toffolo: Toni
José Calvo: Don Nicolone
Manuel Zarzo: Ralph Morisco 
Tommaso Bianco: Michele Cavallo
Isa Danieli: wife of Michele 
Giacomo Rizzo: Cashier 
Herbert Fux
Gigi Reder
Nino Vingelli

References

External links

1973 films
Italian comedy films
1973 comedy films
Films directed by Pasquale Festa Campanile
Films scored by Carlo Rustichelli
Films set in Naples
Films set in the United States
1970s Italian films